Senator Denton may refer to:

Bobby E. Denton (born 1938), Alabama State Senate
Jeremiah Denton (1924–2014), U.S. Senator from Alabama from 1981 to 1987
Julie Denton (born 1960), Kentucky State Senate
Samuel Denton (1803–1860), Michigan State Senate